Rhytiphora heros is a species of beetle in the family Cerambycidae. It was described by Francis Polkinghorne Pascoe in 1863, originally under the genus Iphiastos. It is known from Australia.

References

heros
Beetles described in 1863